Katrin Askan (born 21 February 1966) is a German author. She was born in East Germany, but in 1986, three years before the changes that finally adumbrated an end to the one-party dictatorship, she managed to escape to the west. A (slightly) fictionalised version of the long build-up to the event and of the escape itself, with a powerful resonance of authenticity, constitutes the core of her 2000 novel "Aus dem Schneider".

Life and works
Katrin Askan was born in East Berlin. After passing her Abitur (school leaving exams), which under most circumstances would have cleared the path to university-level education, she was enrolled on a traineeship in a hospital.  She subsequently found work in a book shop.   In 1986 she succeeded in smuggling herself into West Berlin, apparently taking an indirect route that included, during the most critical stage in the exercise, three hours in the boot of a car from the west.   This was followed by a lengthy stay in Sweden where one of the ways in which she supported herself was by undertaking translation work on programmes for radio stations.   She went on to study Germanistics and Philosophy at the Free University in the part of the city known before 1990 as West Berlin.   Then, in 1998, Askan moved to Germany's western media capital, Cologne, where she supports herself as a freelance author and Swedish language translator.

Askan's debut novel, "A-Dur", appeared in 1996. Set in Berlin, it deals with the lives in the German Democratic Republic of three different characters and the destruction of their three individual dreams.  It also treats the more generalised disorientation characteristic of post-modern societies.   It was well reviewed by critics.     "Aus dem Schneider", which appeared four years later, was three times as long and founder a wider audience.  It touched on a number of the same themes.

Since 1988, Askan has also been publishing poems and prose pieces in various journals and anthologies. An example is her short story "Der Skorpion" which appeared in Muschelhaufen. She has also authored a number of radio pieces for Rundfunk Berlin-Brandenburg's Ohrenbär, a producer of radio programmes for children aged between four and eight.

Recognition
In 1998 Katrin Askan won the Friedrich Hölderlin Literary Award ("Förderpreis") from the municipality of Bad Homburg.   In 1999 she was the recipient of the annual Rolf-Dieter Brinkmann Stipendium, funded and administered by her home city of Cologne.   In 2001 she won the "3sat-Prize", one of several annual awards made at the (Klagenfurt) Festival of German-Language Literature, for her novella "Landläufig".

Selected works

Notes

References

1966 births
People from East Berlin
People from Berlin
German-language writers
Writers from Berlin
20th-century German women writers
21st-century German women writers
Living people
German women novelists
German women short story writers
German short story writers
German women poets
20th-century German novelists
20th-century German short story writers
20th-century German poets
21st-century German novelists
21st-century German short story writers
21st-century German poets